Sid Kean was a New Zealand rugby league player who represented New Zealand.

Playing career
Kean played for the City Rovers in the Auckland Rugby League competition. In 1910 he was part of the Auckland side that toured the country, playing matches in Wanganui, Bluff, Invercargill, Dunedin, Napier and Dannevirke.

In 1911 he was selected to play for New Zealand on their tour of Australia. No test matches were played on tour as New Zealand played matches against New South Wales and Queensland.

References

New Zealand rugby league players
New Zealand national rugby league team players
Auckland rugby league team players
Rugby league halfbacks
City Rovers players
Place of birth missing
Year of birth missing
Year of death missing
Place of death missing